The Stade Pierre Claver Divounguy is a stadium primarily used for football matches in Port-Gentil, Gabon. It is the home of the Gabonese team AS Stade Mandji of the Gabon Championnat National D1. The stadium has capacity to 7,000 people.

External links
Venue information

Pierre Claver Divounguy
Port-Gentil